International trips made by the heads of state and heads of government to the United States have become a valuable part of American diplomacy and international relations since such trips were first made in the mid-19th century. They are complicated undertakings that often require months of planning along with a great deal of coordination and communication.

The first international visit to the United States was made by King Kalakaua of Hawaii in 1874, which was the first visit by a foreign chief of state or head of government.

The first Asian head of state to visit the United States was King Prajadhipok of Siam in 1931.

Afghanistan

Bahrain

Bangladesh

Brunei

Cambodia

China
Note: The United States recognized the Republic of China until 1979 when it established diplomatic relations with the People's Republic of China.

East Timor (Timor-Leste)

India

Indonesia

Iran

Iraq

Israel

Japan

Jordan

Kazakhstan

Kyrgyzstan

Kuwait

Korea (Republic of)

Laos

Lebanon

Malaysia

Myanmar (Burma)

Mongolia

Nepal

Oman

Pakistan

Philippines

Qatar

Saudi Arabia

Singapore

Sri Lanka

Syria

Tajikistan

Thailand

Turkey

Turkmenistan

Uzbekistan

Vietnam (Republic of)

Vietnam (Socialist Republic of)

Yemen

See also
 Foreign policy of the United States
 Foreign relations of the United States
 List of international trips made by presidents of the United States
 List of diplomatic visits to the United States
 State visit

References

External links
 Visits by Foreign Leaders – Office of the Historian (United States Department of State)

Asia